Superior Catholic Finger is the second studio album by Helios Creed. It was released in 1989 on Subterranean Records.

Track listing

Personnel 
Musicians
John Carlan – synthesizer
Helios Creed – vocals, guitar, sampler, production
Mark Duran – bass guitar
Tod Preuss – drums
Production and additional personnel
Jonathan Burnside – engineering
George Horn – mastering
Dan Richards – cover art
Steven Tupper – design

References

External links 
 

1989 albums
Helios Creed albums
Subterranean Records albums